= Ghoray Shah =

Sufi shrine in Pakistan

Ghoray Shah, also known as Pir Bahauddin Jhulan Shah Sarkar Shrine, is a famous Sufi shrine in Lahore city, Punjab, Pakistan; it is located in the old area of Lahore . It is the burial place of a supposed 14th-century Sufi saint named Bahauddin Shah or Jhulan Shah. Ghora in urdu called for Horse.People offer Horse toys made of clay that's why it is called Ghoray shah. It is a much-visited place, where tourists come and make supplications and leave small horse figurines as offerings.
